Hochelaga-Maisonneuve is a provincial electoral district in Quebec, Canada, that elects members to the National Assembly of Quebec. The district is located within Montreal, and its territory mostly covers the borough of Mercier–Hochelaga-Maisonneuve, and also parts of Rosemont–La Petite-Patrie,  Ville-Marie and Le Plateau-Mont-Royal boroughs. It is bordered to the east by the Canadian National Railway yard, to the south by the Saint Lawrence River, to the north by Rachel and Sherbrooke Streets and to the west by Frontenac Street.

It was created for the 1989 election from parts of Maisonneuve and Sainte-Marie electoral districts.

In the change from the 2001 to the 2011 electoral map, its territory was unchanged.

Members of the National Assembly

Election results

* Result compared to Action démocratique

References

External links
Information
 Elections Quebec

Election results
 Election results (National Assembly)
 Election results (QuébecPolitique)

Maps
 2011 map (PDF)
 2001 map (Flash)
2001–2011 changes (Flash)
1992–2001 changes (Flash)
 Electoral map of Montréal region
 Quebec electoral map, 2011

Provincial electoral districts of Montreal
Hochelaga-Maisonneuve
Mercier–Hochelaga-Maisonneuve
Rosemont–La Petite-Patrie
Centre-Sud
Le Plateau-Mont-Royal